

This is a list of Indiana state historical markers.

Interest in a statewide system of historical markers for the U.S. state of Indiana arose as the state prepared to celebrate its centenary in 1916; the Indiana Historical Commission observed the lack of a system of historical markers and memorials, and as a result of its work, many individuals, organizations, and local governments began to erect various types of memorials to commemorate historic sites.  Increasing numbers of historical markers through the 1920s and 1930s prompted the Commission and its successor, the Indiana Historical Bureau, to develop statewide lists of markers, and it asked the General Assembly for authority to become involved in the placement of historical markers in order to improve the numbers, quality, and topics of the markers.  The New Deal administrations created to fight the Great Depression of the 1930s provided the manpower for the Bureau's first effort; workers from the Works Progress Administration produced steel signs for locations across the state, but their intentionally temporary nature meant that many had greatly deteriorated by the time that they were removed for scrap during World War II.

After the war's end, state officials began to plan for a system of aluminum markers that could be expected to endure indefinitely.  Although a few markers were placed privately in the first two decades after the war ended, the majority of the few markers that were erected during this time were state-funded markers to celebrate the centenary of the Civil War in the early 1960s.  The state made its first substantial foray into the program in 1966 as it reached the sesquicentenary of statehood, and the Sesquicentennial Commission quickly doubled the number of state-financed markers. However, permanent financial involvement only began in 1989, when substantial funding was first granted for the purchase of markers on a long-term basis. More new markers were placed over the next fifteen years than had been placed since permanent markers were first produced in 1947. By 2012, more than 500 historic sites in 89 of the state's 92 counties had been commemorated by an official Indiana state historical marker.

Numbers of listings by county 
The following are tallies of current marker listings in Indiana by county. These counts are based on entries in the Indiana Historical Bureau's marker list as of March 2012. There are yearly additions to the listings and some markers may be missing or stolen.

See also
National Register of Historic Places listings in Indiana

Notes

References

External links
Indiana Historical Marker Program
Indiana Historical Bureau

Historical Markers